Andrea Navarra (born 25 February 1972) is a former rally driver from Italy.

He scored points in the 1995 and 2004 World Rally Championship seasons, and won the European Rally Championship in 1998.

See also
Rallying in Italy

References

External links
 Driver profile at Ewrc-results.com

1972 births
World Rally Championship drivers
Italian rally drivers
Living people
European Rally Championship drivers